Parviz Aboutaleb (1942 – 9 June 2020) was an Iranian football player and manager. He was born in Tehran, Iran. Aboutaleb died of complications of Alzheimer's disease on June 9, 2020. Parviz will be buried in Tehran's Behesht Zahra Cemetery.

References

1942 births
2020 deaths
Iranian footballers
Iranian football managers
Iran national football team managers
Esteghlal F.C. players
Sportspeople from Tehran
Association football forwards
Deaths from dementia in Iran
Deaths from Alzheimer's disease